Nico Falah (born January 6, 1995) is an American football guard who is currently a free agent. He played college football at USC.

Professional career

Tennessee Titans
Falah signed with the Tennessee Titans as an undrafted free agent on May 11, 2018. He was waived on September 1, 2018.

New York Jets
On September 3, 2018, Falah was signed to the New York Jets practice squad.

Denver Broncos
On October 22, 2018, Falah was signed by the Denver Broncos off the Jets practice squad.

On May 13, 2019, Falah was carted off the practice field with a lower left injury. It was later revealed he suffered a season-ending torn Achilles. He was placed on injured reserve the following day.

On July 27, 2020, he was waived by the Broncos.

Las Vegas Raiders
On December 30, 2021, Falah was signed to the Las Vegas Raiders practice squad. He was released on January 3, 2022.

Pittsburgh Maulers
Falah was drafted by the Pittsburgh Maulers of the United States Football League in the 20th round of the 2022 USFL Draft. He was transferred to the team's inactive roster on April 22, 2022. He was transferred to the active roster on April 30, and back to the inactive roster on May 6 with an illness. He was moved back to the active roster on May 14. He was transferred to the inactive roster again on May 20.

References

External links
USC Trojans bio

1995 births
Living people
American football offensive guards
Denver Broncos players
Las Vegas Raiders players
New York Jets players
People from Hermosa Beach, California
Players of American football from California
Sportspeople from Los Angeles County, California
Tennessee Titans players
USC Trojans football players
Pittsburgh Maulers (2022) players